This is a list of seasons and results completed by HC Slovan Bratislava since its foundation.

League results

1920s

1930s

1940s

1950s

1960s

1970s

1980s

1990s

2000s

2010s

2020s

See also
HC Slovan Bratislava all-time KHL record

Notes
 Until 1985–1986 season no Play-offs were played
 In 1996–1997 season the 6 best teams qualified for final round, in which each team played two games against all other teams. After the final round, 4 best teams qualified for play-offs, the other two teams played two games for 5th place.
 In 1999–00 season only 8 teams participated in the league and only four teams played in the Play-off.
 Since 2001–02 season the Play-off matches are played in best-of-seven format. Before this year, Slovak extraliga matches were played in best-of-five format.
 Since 2006–07 season there are no ties in Slovak Extraliga. If the match is undecided after 60 minutes, a 5-min overtime follows. If it is still a draw, a penalty shootout decides the winner of the match. The winner of the match in regulation time gets 3 points, the loser gets 0 points. The winner after overtime (or shootout) gets 2 points, the loser gets 1 point.

Other notable results

Champions Hockey League

Danube Cup

References

HC Slovan Bratislava